Turki bin Talal Al Saud is a Saudi prince, politician, and military officer who is serving as the governor of Asir since 2018.

Early life and education
Prince Turki is Prince Talal's fourth son. His blood sister is Sara bint Talal. Their mother is Moudie bint Abdul Mohsen Al Angari who was the third wife of Prince Talal. She died in 2008.

Prince Turki has a BSc in political science. He was educated in Royal Military Academy Sandhurst in the UK and in United States Air Force Academy. He received an honorary doctorate degree in management from Amman Arab University in 2015.

Career
Prince Turki served in the Royal Saudi Air Force as a pilot, eventually reaching the rank of brigadier general. He also served as personal representative of his father, Prince Talal bin AbdulAziz Al Saud and as chairman of the Board of Trustees at Mentor Arabia

Other activities 

 Group meetings, most notably the Ramadan seminars, and are concerned with heritage.
 He was famous for his patriotic role, most notably the completion of reconciliation efforts between tribes in retribution cases, in addition to a variety of patriotism, embodying the epic of the conquest of Riyadh through the Riyadh Gate project and the restoration of the historic Al-Anaqer Palace in Thurmada and others.
 He led an urgent relief operation for the Palestinian brothers, in which several international, Arab and local organizations participated, which resulted in his visit to the occupied territories and his prayers at Al-Aqsa Mosque.
 He led relief operations, most notably ground relief for NGOs during the Israeli war in July 2006 on Lebanon, and during the Israeli attack on Gaza in January 2009, transporting medical relief materials, transporting the wounded, and bringing in food for those affected in time of war.
 Establishing humanitarian relief initiatives, such as the initiative We Answer the Appeal for the Relief of Syrian Refugees (according to which he was awarded the Distinguished Arab Personality Award in Relief Work).
 Received the honor of His Highness the Governor of the Riyadh region for the participants in the “Thameen Initiative” projects to support the urban heritage in the region.
 He heads the supervisory board for the buildings of the Arab Open University, which has implemented five universities in five Arab countries, namely Saudi Arabia, Kuwait, Bahrain, Jordan and Egypt, and the implementation of three other buildings is being supervised.

Family 
Prince Turki's  former wife is his cousin, Sara bint Abdullah, a daughter of King Abdullah, who is Turki's father's brother. They have one son, Prince Abdulaziz bin Turki bin Talal Al Saud. Prince Turki also has four daughters: Princess Al Anood, Princess Alia, Princess Abeer and Princess Al Jawhara.

References

External links
Mentor Arabia

Turki
Turki
Graduates of the Royal Military Academy Sandhurst
Living people
Turki
Turki
Turki
Turki
Turki
Year of birth missing (living people)